The 2008–09 Liga Artzit season started on 5 September 2008 and ended on 29 May 2009.

Two teams from Liga Alef were promoted at the end of the previous season: Hapoel Umm al-Fahm and Maccabi Ironi Bat Yam along with two teams relegated from Liga Leumit: Hapoel Nazareth Illit and Hapoel Rishon LeZion.The two teams relegated to Liga Alef were Hapoel Kfar Shalem and Maccabi HaShikma/Ramat Hen.

It was scheduled to be the last season before the league closing, as the top two divisions are both expanded to 16 clubs. As a result of the restructuring, the top seven clubs were promoted to Liga Leumit, whilst the eight-placed club played in a play-off against the 11th-placed club in Liga Leumit for a place in that division. The losers of that match and the bottom four clubs in Liga Artzit were relegated to Liga Alef, which has regain its status as the third tier of Israeli football.

League table

Positions by round

Results
The schedule consisted of three rounds. During first two rounds, each team played each other once home and away for a total of 22 matches. The pairings of the third round were then set according to the standings after first two rounds, giving every team a third game against each opponent for a total of 33 games per team.

First and second round

Third round
Key numbers for pairing determination (number marks position after 22 games):

Promotion playoff
Maccabi Kafr Kanna as the 8th-placed team faced the 11th-placed Liga Leumit team Ironi Ramat HaSharon for a two-legged playoff, Maccabi Kafr Kanna lost both games and were relegated to Liga Alef.

Season statistics

Scoring
First goal of the season: Wajdi Abu Yones for Bnei Tamra against Maccabi Tirat HaCarmel, 2nd minute (5 September 2008)
Widest winning margin: 8 goals: Hapoel Umm al-Fahm 0–8 Hapoel Marmorek (29 May 2009)
Most goals in a match: 8 goals: Hapoel Umm al-Fahm 0–8 Hapoel Marmorek (29 May 2009)

Discipline
First yellow card of the season: Roshdi Soph for Bnei Tamra against Maccabi Tirat HaCarmel, 13th minute (5 September 2008)
First red card of the season: Moshe Ben Haim for Ironi Bat Yam against Hapoel Rishon LeZion, 73rd minute (29 August 2008)

Top scorers

See also
List of Israeli football transfers 2008–09
2008–09 Toto Cup Artzit

References

Liga Artzit seasons
3
Israel